Rudolf Jansen (born January 19, 1940, in Arnhem) is a Dutch pianist, who studied piano, organ and harpsichord simultaneously at the Conservatoire of Amsterdam. His teachers were Nelly Wagenaar, his father Simon C. Jansen, Felix de Nobel and Gustav Leonhardt. His studies were crowned by two Prix d'Excellence, one for piano and one for organ.

In 1965 he was awarded the Toonkunst Jubileumprijs, in 1966 the "Zilveren Vriendenkrans" by the Friends of the Concertgebouw. He won the Edison Award twice: in 1973 with Han de Vries (oboe), and 1987 with Dorothy Dorow (soprano).

As well as being a solo performer, Rudolf Jansen has gradually come to specialize in Lied accompaniment and chamber music. He travels the world over with concert tours in which he accompanies highly reputed artists such as Elly Ameling, Robert Holl, Hanneke Kaasschieter, Han de Vries, Peter Schreier, Andreas Schmidt, Olaf Bär, Tom Krause, Brigitte Fassbänder, Barbara Bonney, Hans Peter Blochwitz, Edith Wiens, Jean-Pierre Rampal and Abbie de Quant.

He teaches at the Sweelinck Conservatoire and regularly gives masterclasses for song/piano duos in the Netherlands and abroad.

References
 Rudolf Jansen

1940 births
Living people
Dutch classical pianists
People from Arnhem
21st-century classical pianists